Natale a cinque stelle is a 2018 Italian comedy film directed by Marco Risi, starring Andrea Osvárt, Martina Stella and Björn Freiberg.

It was released worldwide by Netflix on 7 December 2018.

Plot
An Italian political delegation is on an official visit to Hungary. Secretly, the Premier also has plans for spending time with a young member of the delegation. Problems arise when a corpse turns up in the suite of the luxurious hotel where they stay.

Cast
 Andrea Osvárt as Berta
 Martina Stella as Giulia
 Björn Freiberg
 Massimo Ghini as Franco
 Ricky Memphis as Walter
 Paola Minaccioni as Marisa
 Rocco Siffredi as himself

Distribution
It was distributed through the Netflix streaming service from 7 December 2018.

See also
 List of Christmas films

References

External links

2010s Christmas comedy films
2018 films
Italian-language Netflix original films
2010s Italian-language films
Italian Christmas comedy films
2018 comedy films
2010s Italian films
Films scored by Bruno Zambrini